Ndumiso Phakamani Mngadi (born 10 October 1994) is a South African professional footballer who most recently played as a midfielder or winger for Jomo Cosmos.

Career
As a youth player, Mngadi joined the Qatari Aspire Academy. He started his career with Belgian side Eupen. In 2014, Mngadi was sent on loan to Kaizer Chiefs in the South African top flight. In 2019, he signed for South African second tier club Jomo Cosmos, where he made six league appearances. On 20 November 2019, Mngadi debuted for Jomo Cosmos during a 1-0 win over Royal Eagles.

References

External links
 

Living people
1994 births
Sportspeople from Pietermaritzburg
South African soccer players
Association football midfielders
Association football wingers
Challenger Pro League players
Kaizer Chiefs F.C. players
K.A.S. Eupen players
Jomo Cosmos F.C. players
South African expatriate soccer players
South African expatriate sportspeople in Qatar
Expatriate footballers in Qatar
South African expatriate sportspeople in Belgium
Expatriate footballers in Belgium